Larrakia (also Larrakeyah and other variants) may refer to:

 Larrakia people, an ethnic group of Australia
 Larrakia language, their language
Larrakeyah, a suburb of Darwin, Australia
Larrakeyah Barracks, the primary Australian military base in the Northern Territory
Radio Larrakia, a Darwin-based FM-band community radio station
Larrakia Park, a park in Darwin including the Darwin Football Stadium
, two ships of the Royal Australian Navy
Adsteam Larrakia, a tugboat and emergency response vessel operating at the Wickham Point LNG terminal

See also
Latakia (disambiguation), a city in Syria, and related terms

Language and nationality disambiguation pages